Nanak Singh, (b. 4 July 1897 as Hans Raj – 28 December 1971), was an Indian poet, songwriter, and novelist of the Punjabi language. His literary works in support of India's independence movement led the British to arrest him. He published novels that won him literary acclaim.

Early life
Nanak Singh was born to a poor Punjabi Hindu family in the Jhelum district of Pakistan as 'Hans Raj'. He later changed his name to Nanak Singh after adopting Sikhism. Although he did not receive a formal education, he started writing at an early age by writing verses on historical events. Later, Singh started to write devotional songs, encouraging Sikhs to join the Gurdwara Reform Movement. In 1918, he published his first book Satguru Mehma, which contained hymns in praise of the Sikh Gurus. It is considered his first commercially successful literary work.

Indian Independence movement
On 13 April 1919 British troops shot and killed 379 peaceful rally participants in what became known as the Jallianwala Bagh Massacre on Baisakhi (Punjabi New Year) day in Amritsar. Singh was present with two friends who were killed in the massacre. This incident impelled Singh to write Khomeini Visayans – Bloody Baisakhi (Punjabi New Year), an epic poem that mocked colonial rule. The British Government became concerned about his provocative publication and banned the book.

Singh participated in India's independence struggle by joining the Akali movement. He became the editor of Akali papers. This was noticed by the British Government. Singh was charged with participation in unlawful political activities and was sent to Borstal Jail, Lahore. He described the savagery and oppression of the British on peaceful Sikhs during the Guru ka Bagh Mocha demonstration in his second poetry collection, Zakhmi Dil. It was published in January 1923, and was banned within two weeks of publication.

Singh wrote several novels during his time in jail, including over 40,000 pages in longhand Gurmukhi (Punjabi) script.

He was publicly recognized with many awards, including Punjab's highest literary award in 1960. His great historical novel, Ik Mian Do Talwaran (One Sheath and Two Swords, 1959), won him India's highest literary honor, the Sahitya Akademi Award, in 1962.

Prolific writer
In 1945 he wrote his popular novel , which won him acclaim.  It was translated into Hindi and other Indian languages, and into English by his grandson Navdeep Singh Suri. In 1968 the book was adapted into the successful motion picture, (Pavitra Paapi), by his admirer Balraj Sahani an Nanak Singh wrote dialogue and screenplay for Dara Singh he's Punjabi movie Nanak Dukhiya Sub Sansar.

Quoting the Tribune, "Nanak Singh was the best selling novelist in India for thirty to forty years. He wrote over 50 books including novels and collection of short stories. He made significant contributions to various literary genres. For him character was the determination of incident and incident the illustration of character. His greatest contribution to Punjabi fiction is its secularization. He depicted excerpts from contemporary life, cloaked with a veil of romantic idealism." 

In his novel Chitta Lahu (White Blood), Singh writes, "It seems to imply that in the lifeblood of our society, red corpuscles have disappeared." In 2011, Singh's grandson, Dilraj Singh Suri, translated Chitta Lahu into English (titled White Blood). Natasha Tolstoy, the granddaughter of novelist Leo Tolstoy, translated Singh's novel Chitta Lahu into Russian. She visited Nanak Singh in Amritsar to present to him the first copy of the translated novel.

Bibliography

Books By Nanak Singh ( Novel, Stories, Play, Translated Novel)
 Aastak Nastak
 Adam Khor
 Adh-khiria Phul
 Agg Di Khed
 An-site Zakham
 B.A. Pass
 Bhooa
 Charhdi Kala
 Chhalawa
 Chitrakar
 Chitta Lahu
 Chod Chanan
 Dhundle Parchhaven
 Dur Kinara
 Fauladi Phull
 France Da Daku
 Gagan Damama Bajia
 Gangajali Vich Sharab
 Gharib Di Duniya
 Hanjuan De Har
 Ik Mian Do Talwaran
 Jivan Sangram
 Kagtan Di Beri
 Kal Chakkar
 Kati Hoyee Patang
 Kallo
 Khoon De Sohile
 Koi Haria Boot Rahio Ri
 Lamma Painda
 Love Marriage
 Manjhdhar
 Matreyee Maan
 Meri Duniya
 Merian Sadivi Yadan
 Middhe Hoe Phull
 Mittha Mauhra
 Nasoor
 Paap Di Khatti
 Paraschit
 Pathar De Khamb
 Pathar Kamba
 Patjhar De Panchhi
 Pavitar Papi
 Piar Da Devta
 Piar Di Duniya
 Prem Sangeet
 Pujari
 Rabb Apne Asli Rup Vich
 Rajni
 Saarh Sati
 Sangam
 Sarapian Roohan
 Soolan Di Sej
 Suman Kanta
 Sunehri Jild
 Supnian Di Kabar
 Swarg Te Usde Varis
 Taash Di Aadat
 Tasvir De Doven Pase
 Thandian Chhavan
 Tutte Khambh
 Tutti Veena
 Vadda Doctor Te Hor Kahanian
 Var Nahin Sarap
 Vishwas Ghaat

Adaptations of his works 
Pavitra Paapi, a 1970 Indian Hindi-language drama film was based on his novel of the same name. His short story Sunehri Jild was adapted into a television short of the same name that aired on DD Punjabi.

Legacy

His centenary was celebrated in 1997. In honor of Singh, India's Prime Minister Inder Kumar Gujral released a postal stamp with his image in 1998.

References

Indian male novelists
Punjabi-language poets
People from Jhelum
Recipients of the Sahitya Akademi Award in Punjabi
1897 births
1971 deaths
Punjabi-language writers
20th-century Indian poets
20th-century Indian novelists
Indian male poets
20th-century Indian male writers
Sikh writers